The Montrose Avenue were a British rock band, formed in 1996 and were based in Wokingham, Berkshire. The group were composed of lead singer and guitarist Robert Lindsey-Clark, pianist, guitarist and vocalist Scott James, vocalist and guitarist Paul Williams, bassist James Taylor and drummer Matt Everitt who left Menswear to join the group.

James and Williams met at school in Reading, and first performed together as a duo covering material by The Byrds and Moby Grape. They met Lindsey-Clark at a folk club and the trio formed Montrose Avenue in 1996. Taylor and Everitt then completed the line-up and signed a recording contract with Columbia Records the following year. The limited edition She's Looking For Me EP, released in 1997, charted at #118 in the UK singles chart. This was then followed by their first mainstream single in March 1998, in which "Where Do I Stand" proved to be their only top 40 hit, charting at #38. "Shine" then followed up three months later charting at #59, before their final single "Start Again" released in October, charted at #58.

Their only album, Thirty Days Out, was released a week after the release of "Start Again" on 12 October 1998 before charting at number 102 in the UK and at number 69 in Japan. Despite establishing a cult following in the Far East, The Montrose Avenue never released another album only to disband in 1999. James later went on to work with Welsh rock band Stereophonics as a touring guitarist between 2001–2004, while also appearing in the band's music videos "Have a Nice Day" and "Step On My Old Size Nines". Everitt now works on the news team at radio station BBC 6 Music after starting off at London-based rock station XFM. Before working in radio and after The Montrose Avenue disbanded, Everitt was a music journalist.

Discography

Album 
Thirty Days Out (1998) - #102 (UK) #69 (Japan)

Singles 
"She's looking For Me EP" (1997) - #118 (UK)
"Where Do I Stand" (1998) - #38 (UK)
"Shine" (1998) - #59 (UK)
"Start Again" (1998) - #58 (UK)

Members 
 Robert Lindsey-Clark - guitars, lead vocals
 Scott James - piano, guitars, vocals
 Paul Williams - guitars, vocals
 James Taylor - bass
 Matt Everitt - drums

Former Members
Robert Gillibrand - drums
Lewis Henderson - keyboard, guitar

References

External links 
 The Montrose Avenue on Myspace

English rock music groups
Musical groups established in 1996
Musical groups disestablished in 1999